Sultan Ali Ri'ayat Syah III (died 4 April 1607) was the eleventh Sulṭān of Acèh Darussalam in northern Sumatra. He had a brief and turbulent reign from 1604 to 1607 before being succeeded by his more famous nephew Iskandar Muda.

Dynastic trouble

Sultan Muda, the future Sultan Ali, was the second son of Sultan Alauddin Ri'ayat Syah Sayyid al-Mukammal. In the early 1600s, he was made co-regent to his aged father. In April 1604 the old sultan was deposed and Sultan Muda was enthroned under the throne name Sultan Ali Ri'ayat Syah. His brief reign was marked by a severe drought which caused famine and death to many people. Moreover, dynastic instability afflicted the kingdom. In 1605 he picked up a fight with his brother Husain, vassal raja of Pidië. Sultan Ali's and Husain's nephew Perkasa Alam, the later Sultan Iskandar Muda, had been punished by the sultan and therefore fled to Pidië. Sultan Ali demanded his extradition but Husain refused. Husain came in open rebellion and ordered his nephew to lead the Pidië troops in a campaign against the capital, but in the end, the soldiers plainly refused to fight. Perkasa Alam was therefore captured and brought back to Kutaraja where he was confined to prison.

The Portuguese attack and the demise of Sultan Ali

Relations with the Portuguese of Melaka had worsened since 1600. The Portuguese authorities were concerned that Aceh allowed trade with the Dutch East India Company and wished to erect a fortress at the strategically vital estuary of the Aceh River. 14 galleons, 4 galleys and some ships of transport headed for Aceh under the command of Viceroy Martim Afonso de Castro and landed close to Kutaraja in June 1606. After negotiations with the sultan had failed the invaders attacked and conquered one redoubt. Perkasa Alam besought the sultan that he would rather fall in battle against the infidels than rot away in prison. In the perilous situation his request was granted; Perkasa Alam was known as a redoubtable warrior since his youth. In the following battle, the prince distinguished himself greatly and the Portuguese attack was halted. De Castro probably heard of a strong Dutch and Johorese force which had attacked Melaka and therefore cancelled the invasion. Due to his military feat Perkasa Alam came in high esteem at the court. His mother Puteri Raja Inderabangsa, the sultan's sister, prepared the way for his rise by distributing money to the mercantile elite, the orang kayas. When Sultan Ali suddenly died on 4 April 1607, Perkasa Alam secured the loyalty of the palace guards by generous gifts, gave the officers attractive promises, and threatened the qadi who opposed his enthronement. On the same day as his uncle died he was, therefore, able to ascend the throne, taking the name Iskandar Muda. Under him Aceh would reach its political apogee.

References

Literature

 Djajadiningrat, Raden Hoesein (1911) 'Critisch overzicht van de in Maleische werken vervatte gegevens over de geschiedenis van het soeltanaat van Atjeh', Bijdragen tot de Taal-, Land- en Volkenkunde 65, pp. 135–265.
 Encyclopaedie van Nederlandsch Indië, Vol. 1 (1917). 's Gravenhage & Leiden: Nijhoff & Brill.
 Hadi, Amirul (2004) Islam and State in Sumatra: A Study of Seventeenth-Century Aceh. Leiden: Brill.
 Penth, Hans (1969) Hikajat Atjeh: Die Erzählung von der Abkunft und den Jugendjaren des Sultan Iskandar Muda von Atjeh (Sumatra). Wiesbaden: Otto Harrassowitz.

Sultans of Aceh
1607 deaths
Year of birth missing
17th-century Indonesian people
16th-century Indonesian people